Buddhist music is music created for or inspired by Buddhism and part of Buddhist art.

Honkyoku
Honkyoku (本曲) are the pieces of shakuhachi or hocchiku music played by wandering Japanese Zen monks called Komuso. Komuso temples were abolished in 1871, but their music, honkyoku, is one of the most popular contemporary music styles in Japan. Komuso played honkyoku for enlightenment and alms as early as the 13th century. In the 18th century, a Komuso named Kinko Kurosawa of the Fuke sect of Zen Buddhism was commissioned to travel throughout Japan and collect these musical pieces. The results of several years of travel and compilation were thirty-six pieces known as the Kinko-Ryu Honkyoku.

Chanting
The chanting of mantras used in or inspired by Buddhism, including many genres in many cultures:

Repetition of Pāli chanting of "Namo Tassa Bhagavato Arahato Samma Sambuddhassa"
Repetition of Pāli chanting of Tisarana
Repetition of the name of Amitabha in Pure Land Buddhism.   
Repetitious chanting of Nam-myoho-renge-kyo and excerpts of the Lotus Sutra within Nichiren Buddhism.
Shomyo in Japanese Tendai and Shingon Buddhism.    
Japanese chanted poetry shigin (詩吟).
Throat singing in Tibetan Buddhist chants.

Tibetan styles
Tibetan Buddhism is the most widespread religion in Tibet. Musical chanting, most often in Tibetan or Sanskrit, is an integral part of the religion. These chants are complex, often recitations of sacred texts or in celebration of various festivals. Yang chanting, performed without metrical timing, is accompanied by resonant drums and low, sustained syllables. Individual schools such as the Gelug, Nyingma, Sakya and Kagyu, and even individual monasteries, maintain their own chant traditions. Each instrument mimics the sound of an animal, the drums being the footsteps of elephants and the horns mimic bird calls.

Shomyo
Shomyo (声明) is a style of Japanese Buddhist chant; mainly in the Tendai and Shingon sects. There are two styles: ryokyoku and rikkyoku, described as difficult and easy to remember, respectively.

Notable Buddhist musicians 

 Ven.Bibiladeniye Mahanama Thero
 Ani Choying Dolma
 David Bowie
 Kinko Kurosawa
 Imee Ooi
 Eliane Radigue
 Tokyo Kosei Wind Orchestra
 Adam Yauch
 Duncan Sheik
 Sergiu Celibidache
 Premasiri Khemadasa
 Dinesh Subasinghe]
 Victor Ratnayake
 Alan Dawa Dolma
 Leonard Cohen
 Michael Jordan Touchdown Pass
 Kanho Yakushiji
 Tan Dun
 David Earl (composer)
 Timothy Lissimore
 Justin Merritt
 John Cage

Greater China 
Li Na, a famous Chinese singer who became a nun in 1997, produced many popular Buddhist music albums under her new name Master Chang Sheng (释昌圣). Influential C-pop singers like Faye Wong and Chyi Yu (who released 4 albums featuring Buddhist chants) also helped Buddhist music reach a wider audience.

Beyond Singing 
In 2009, the Beyond Singing Project produced an album combining Buddhist chants and Christian choral music.

The musicians involved were: 
 Tina Turner
 Dechen Shak-Dagsay

See also 

 Karuna Nadee

References

 
Religious music